Lake Petenwell is an artificial lake on the Wisconsin River in central Wisconsin. It is located in Adams, Juneau, and Wood counties next to Castle Rock Lake.

It was created in 1948 by the Wisconsin River Power Company with the construction of a dam across the Wisconsin River near Necedah. Private lakefront property is very limited as most of the virgin shoreline is undeveloped forest. Wildlife includes wintering bald eagles. Game fish include walleye, northern pike, bass, panfish, and muskellunge.

The area around the lake has restaurants, a community theater, a golf course and two casinos.

Algae
Blue-green algae was reported in the lake in 2013. In 2019, Adams County website stated that the beaches were not closed due to algae, and that the situation was being monitored.

References

External links
Petenwell Castlerock Property Owners Association
Wisconsin Dept of Natural Resources
Petenwell County Park
Petenwell Grand View Shores Association

Reservoirs in Wisconsin
Lakes of Adams County, Wisconsin
Lakes of Juneau County, Wisconsin
Lakes of Wood County, Wisconsin